Play5 started in October 2004 as Play Media's second channel and a sister channel to VIER (formerly VT4).

History 

On 1 October 2004, the first broadcast was that of a soccer game, even though women are the channel's target audience. By doing that the station made sure that men also would set their TV up to view VIJF.

In 2005, its first full year of operation, VIJFtv gained a 5% market share in Flanders, almost matching Kanaaltwee (now 2BE) and VT4.

In January 2006, VIJFtv doubled its programming hours and began broadcasting 24 hours every day.

VIJFtv began broadcasting the American daytime soap opera The Bold and the Beautiful (in Dutch Mooi en Meedogenloos) on 4 January 2006. It was first shown on public TV, then on VTM, but the rights were sold to SBS Belgium. That also caused an increase of the market share in the early evening.

During the Soccer World Championship, broadcast on Kanaaltwee and VT4, VIJFtv broadcast "women-friendly" programs. They did this using the slogan Vrouwen weten waarom ("Women know why"), referring to the popular Jupiler beer slogan Mannen weten waarom ("Men know why"). The formula was a success and VIJF's market share grew even further.

On 27 August 2007, VIJF relaunched with 15 new station idents. On the same day, the channel introduced in-vision continuity. Prior to the change in presentation, VIJFtv used Now/Next/Later visuals and voice overs.

On 3 September 2012, VIJFtv's name changed to VIJF, along with new programming and new TV shows.

On 7 June 2019, it was announced that the channel would be eventually rebranded as "Five" and shift to a more general entertainment format as part of the rebranding under the "Play" name. The following year, it was decided that the channel would instead rebrand as Play5 on 28 January 2021.

Internet television
In 2007, VIJF struck a deal with Zattoo so that Belgian residents can watch the channel using their online television service for free. With the closure of the Belgian Zattoo service in early 2009, VIJFtv disappeared from the platform.

Programming

 Accidentally on Purpose
 America's Next Top Model
 Army Wives
 Astrid in Wonderland
 Bizarre ER
 Body of Proof
 Charmed
 Close to Home
 Cold Case
 Cougar Town
 Columbo
 Dallas
 Dance Moms
 Days of Our Lives
 Dawson's Creek
 Debbie Travis' Facelift
 Dr. Phil
 Dr. Quinn, Medicine Woman
 ER
 Everwood
 Extreme Makeover: Home Edition
 Fairly Legal
 Falcon Beach
 For Love or Money
 Friday Night Lights
 Friends
 Gilmore Girls
 Gossip Girl
 Greatest American Dog
 Grey's Anatomy
 Harley Street
 How to Look Good Naked
 I Shouldn't Be Alive
 Judging Amy
 Life's Little Miracles
 Lipstick Jungle
 Location, Location, Location
 Love Island
 Made
 Matlock
 Medium
 Melrose Place
 Men in Trees
 Miami Medical
 Monk
 Moonlight
 Murder, She Wrote
 My Restaurant Rules
 Mystery ER
 Nanny 911
 Notes from the Underbelly
 One Tree Hill
 Pan Am
 Poor Little Rich Girls
 Pretty Little Liars
 Private Practice
 Providence
 Rescue Me
 Revenge
 Rizzoli & Isles
 Rookie Blue
 Samantha Who?
 Seinfeld
 Sex and the City
 Strong Medicine
 Stylista
 Summerland
 Swingtown
 Supernatural
 Taggart
 Te Nemen Of Te Laten (Deal or No Deal)
 The Bachelor
 The Block
 The Bold and the Beautiful
 The Client List
 The Closer
 The Dead Zone
 The Dog Whisperer
 The Filth Files
 The Flying Doctors
 The Good Wife
 The Hotel Inspector
 The L Word
 The Love Boat
 The Nanny
 The Oprah Winfrey Show
 The Real Housewives
 The Vampire Diaries
 The X-Files
 The Young Doctors
 Three Rivers
 Three Wishes
 Tim Gunn's Guide to Style
 Toddlers & Tiaras
 Ugly Betty
 Unforgettable
 What Not to Wear
 What Not to Wear USA
 Will & Grace
 Without a Trace

References

Television channels in Flanders
Television channels in Belgium
ProSiebenSat.1 Media
Television channels and stations established in 2004